Reinhold Charles Weege (December 23, 1949 – December 1, 2012) was an American television writer, producer and director. He was born in Chicago, Illinois.

Weege wrote for several television series, including Barney Miller and M*A*S*H. In 1981, he created the short-lived sitcom Park Place. In 1984, he created the sitcom Night Court, which ran for nine seasons on NBC. Weege owned Starry Night Productions, which produced Night Court until 1989, when Weege left the series after six seasons. He produced the unsold sitcom pilot Nikki and Alexander in 1989. He was nominated for four Emmy Awards during his career, one for Barney Miller and three for Night Court.

Weege died on December 1, 2012, at the age of 62, in La Jolla, California, of natural causes. Actor John Larroquette, who played Night Court prosecutor Dan Fielding, paid tribute to Weege in a Twitter post: "In life there are those who impact us with such force everything changes. Reinhold Weege was that in mine. May he truly rest in peace."

References

External links

1949 births
2012 deaths
Television producers from Illinois
American television writers
Burials at Forest Lawn Memorial Park (Hollywood Hills)
American male television writers
American television directors
Writers from Chicago
Screenwriters from Illinois
20th-century American screenwriters
20th-century American male writers